Antonio Esposito may refer to:
 Antonio Esposito (footballer, born 1972), Swiss-Italian former midfielder
 Antonio Esposito (footballer, born 1983), Italian midfielder
 Antonio Esposito (footballer, born 1990), Italian midfielder
 Antonio Esposito (footballer, born 2000), Italian fullback
 Antonio Esposito (judoka), born 1994, Italian judoka
 Tony Esposito (musician), born 1950, Italian singer and songwriter